Michael Lynn, III (May 18, 1936 – July 21, 2012) was an American football general manager and executive.  He served as the general manager of the National Football League's Minnesota Vikings from 1975 to 1990.

Memphis
Prior to a career in sports, Lynn managed movie theaters in Memphis, Tennessee. From 1966 to 1974 he was President of Mid South Sports, Inc., a group that sought to acquire a National Football League franchise for Memphis. Lynn also served as President of the Memphis Pros of the American Basketball Association in 1972.

Minnesota Vikings
In 1974, Lynn was hired by the Minnesota Vikings as an assistant to the owner. He was named general manager in 1975 by then Vikings owner Max Winter following the departure of GM Jim Finks. Lynn was GM when the Vikings went to one Super Bowl and four Division Championship during his first four years with the team. In 1989, thinking that the Vikings were a big-time running back away from being a great team, he dealt what eventually turned into 5 players and 8 draft picks to the Dallas Cowboys in exchange for running back Herschel Walker. The three 1st round and three 2nd round picks eventually netted the Cowboys Emmitt Smith, Darren Woodson, and Russell Maryland and three Super Bowl rings. On the Vikings' side, Walker gained 148 yards rushing on 18 carries in his first game, but averaged less than 81 yards a game for the other 26 games.

WLAF
In 1990, Lynn was named president of the World League of American Football. He resigned as Vikings general manager, but retained his position as executive vice president. Lynn resigned as WLAF president on August 3, 1991 after less than one year on the job.

Return to Vikings
In December 1991, a group aligned with Lynn purchased the shares of feuding Vikings minority partners Irwin L. Jacobs and Carl Pohlad. Two months later his 10% stake in the team was purchased by the club's nine other partners.

Later life and death
In 1983, Lynn purchased Walter Place in Holly Springs, Mississippi. The Lynns fulfilled the ambition of former Walter Place owner Oscar Johnson by building a walking park with water features and botanical gardens on an adjacent piece of property. They also acquired Featherston Place and Polk Place. Lynn died on July 21, 2012 at Baptist Memorial Hospital – North Mississippi in Oxford, Mississippi.

References

1936 births
2012 deaths
Memphis Sounds executives
Minnesota Vikings executives
Minnesota Vikings owners
People from Holly Springs, Mississippi
People from Memphis, Tennessee
Sportspeople from Scranton, Pennsylvania